Dengzhoulu Station, literally Dengzhou Road Station in English, is a station of Line 2 western section of the Tianjin Metro. It started operations on 1 July 2012.

References

Railway stations in Tianjin
Railway stations in China opened in 2012
Tianjin Metro stations